Elizabeth Cook Zsiga (b. 1964) is a linguist whose work focuses on phonology and phonetics. She is a Professor of Linguistics at Georgetown University.

Education and career 
Zsiga completed her Ph.D. at Yale University in 1993 as a student of Louis M. Goldstein, and affiliated with Haskins Laboratories, with a dissertation titled Features, gestures, and the temporal aspects of phonological organization. She has been on the faculty at Georgetown since 1994, as Assistant Professor (1994-1999), Associate Professor (1999-2011), and Professor (since 2011).

Zsiga has received numerous awards and federal grants from the National Science Foundation, including projects on the conservation of endangered languages (2007-2008), on the phonetics of consonants in Setswana and Sebirwa (2010 and 2011–2014), and as director for doctoral projects on the phonetics of Burmese tones (2009), consonant weakening in Florentine Italian (2007), acquisition of tone in a second language (2015), neutralization of phonemic contrasts in Dutch and Afrikaans (2019), and iconicity in American Sign Language (2020).

She is the author of a well-received introductory textbook (Zsiga 2013) to phonetics and phonology.

Selected publications

Books
Zsiga, Elizabeth C. (2013) The Sounds of Language: An Introduction to Phonetics and Phonology. Wiley-Blackwell. ISBN 978-1-405-19103-6
Zsiga, Elizabeth C., R. Kramer, and O. Boyer, Eds. (2015). Languages in Africa: Multilingualism, Education, and Language Policy. Georgetown University Press. ISBN (e-book):  9781626161535

Selected articles

 Zsiga, Elizabeth C. (2011). "External Sandhi in a Second Language: The Phonetics and Phonology of Obstruent Nasalization in Korean-Accented English". Language, 87(2):289-345.
 Zsiga. Elizabeth C. (2000). "Phonetic alignment constraints: consonant overlap and palatalization in English and Russian". Journal of Phonetics, 28(1):69-102.
 Zsiga, E. (1995). An acoustic and electropalatographic study of lexical and postlexical palatalization in American English. In B. Connell & A. Arvaniti (Eds.), Phonology and Phonetic Evidence: Papers in Laboratory Phonology IV (Papers in Laboratory Phonology, pp. 282–302). Cambridge: Cambridge University Press. doi:10.1017/CBO9780511554315.020

References

Living people
Women linguists
American phonologists
Georgetown University faculty
Yale Graduate School of Arts and Sciences alumni
Haskins Laboratories scientists
1964 births
Phoneticians